Mercury 8 or variants may refer to:

 Mercury Eight, a Ford motor car 1939–1951
 Mercury 8, a spacecraft of Project Mercury
 Mercury VIII, a 1935 version of the Bristol Mercury aircraft engine

See also
 Mercury (disambiguation)
 Mercury-Atlas 8, a 1962 crewed space flight
 Mercury V8, an automobile